Eric Clapton's Rainbow Concert is a live album by Eric Clapton, recorded at the Rainbow Theatre in London on 13 January 1973 and released in September that year. The concerts, two on the same evening, were organised by Pete Townshend of the Who and marked a comeback by Clapton after two years of inactivity, broken only by his performance at the Concert for Bangladesh in August 1971. Along with Townshend, the musicians supporting Clapton include Steve Winwood, Ronnie Wood and Jim Capaldi. In the year following the two shows at the Rainbow, Clapton recovered from his heroin addiction and recorded 461 Ocean Boulevard (1974).

A remastered expanded edition of the album was released on 13 January 1995, the 22nd anniversary of the concert.

Background 
The concert was held at the Rainbow Theatre in Finsbury Park, north London, on 13 January 1973. The venue was popular during the 1960s and early 1970s; musicians such as The Beatles,  The Who,  Genesis, Deep Purple, Pink Floyd, Jethro Tull and Queen performed there. The concert was recorded using Ronnie Lane's Mobile Studio.

Reception

In a retrospective review, AllMusic deemed the album "an adequate live document, though one can find better performances of the songs on other records." The review also noted that the performance was an ensemble effort, and was as much a showcase for Steve Winwood as it was for Clapton.

Track listing 

Side one 
"Badge" (Eric Clapton, George Harrison) – 3:32
"Roll It Over" (Clapton, Bobby Whitlock) – 6:43
"Presence of the Lord" (Clapton) – 5:37

Side two
"Pearly Queen" (Jim Capaldi, Steve Winwood) – 7:00
"After Midnight" (J. J. Cale) – 5:12
"Little Wing" (Jimi Hendrix) – 6:32

1995 remastered edition 
"Layla" (Clapton, Jim Gordon) – 6:25
"Badge" (Clapton, Harrison) – 3:18
"Blues Power" (Clapton, Leon Russell) – 6:03
"Roll It Over" (Clapton, Whitlock) – 4:38
"Little Wing" (Hendrix) – 4:36
"Bottle of Red Wine" (Bonnie Bramlett, Clapton) – 3:51
"After Midnight" (Cale) – 4:25
"Bell Bottom Blues" (Clapton, Whitlock) – 6:25
"Presence of the Lord" (Clapton) – 5:18
"Tell the Truth" (Clapton, Whitlock) – 6:04
"Pearly Queen" (Capaldi, Winwood) – 4:55
"Key to the Highway" (Big Bill Broonzy, Charlie Segar) – 5:46
"Let It Rain" (Bramlett, Clapton) – 7:46
"Crossroads" (Robert Johnson) – 4:19

25th Anniversary Edition (Empress Valley Bootleg)[edit] (4 CDs – Early Show (1+2) + Late Show (3+4)) 
 Introduction
 Layla (Clapton, Gordon)
 Badge (Clapton, Harrison)
 Blues Power (Clapton, Russell)
 Nobody Knows You When You're Down and Out (Myles)
 Roll It Over (Clapton, Whitlock)
 Why Does Love Got to Be So Sad (Clapton, Whitlock)
 Little Wing (Hendrix)
 Bottle of Red Wine (Bramlett, Clapton)
 After Midnight (Cale)
 Bell Bottom Blues (Clapton)
 Presence of the Lord (Clapton)
 Tell The Truth (Clapton, Whitlock)
 Pearly Queen (Capaldi, Winwood)
 Let It Rain (Bramlett, Clapton)
 Crossroads (Johnson)
 Layla (Clapton, Gordon)
 Badge (Clapton, Harrison)
 Blues Power (Clapton, Russell)
 Nobody Knows You When You're Down and Out (Myles)
 Roll It Over (Clapton, Whitlock)
 Why Does Love Got to Be So Sad (Clapton, Whitlock)
 Little Wing (Hendrix)
 Bottle of Red Wine (Bramlett, Clapton)
 Presence of the Lord (Clapton)
 Tell the Truth (Clapton, Whitlock)
 Pearly Queen (Capaldi, Winwood)
 Key to the Highway (Broonzy, Segar)
 Let It Rain (Bramlett, Clapton)
 Crossroads (Johnson)
 Layla (Clapton, Gordon)

Personnel 
 Eric Clapton – guitar (lead) & vocals
 Pete Townshend – guitar (rhythm) & vocals
 Ron Wood – guitar (rhythm and slide) & vocals
 Ric Grech – bass guitar
 Steve Winwood – keyboards & vocals
 Jim Capaldi – drums & vocals
 Jimmy Karstein – drums
 Rebop Kwaku Baah – percussion

References

Eric Clapton live albums
1973 live albums
RSO Records live albums